Bulinus jousseaumei is a species of tropical freshwater snail, an aquatic gastropod mollusk in the family Planorbidae, the ramshorn snails and their allies.
Like other planorbids, the shell of the species is sinistral in coiling.

Distribution
The distribution of Bulinus jousseaumei includes Western Africa:
 Burkina Faso
 Gambia
 Mali
 Niger
 Nigeria
 Senegal
 Togo

The type locality for this species is the Sénégal River close to Médine, Mali.

Description 
The width of the shell is 8 mm. The height of the shell is 11 mm.

Diploid chromosome number is 2n = 36.

Ecology 
This snail lives in permanent streams. It can live in a water current that has a speed up to 0.86 m·s−1 based on laboratory experiments.

The male part of the reproductive system is developed "slightly earlier" (protandry) in Bulinus jousseaumei.

This species is an intermediate host for Schistosoma curassoni and for Schistosoma haematobium.

References

Further reading 
 Green P., Dussart G. B. J. & Gibson C. (1992). "Surfacing and water-leaving behaviour of the freshwater pulmonate snails Lymnaea peregra (Müller), Biomphalaria glabrata (Say) and Bulinus jousseaumei (Dautzenberg)". Journal of Molluscan Studies 58(2): 169-179. .
 Wright C. A. (1957). "Studies on the structure and taxonomy of Bulinus jousseaumei (Dautzenberg)". Bulletin of the British Museum (Natural History), Zoology 5: 1-28.

External links 

Bulinus
Gastropods described in 1890